Corey Brunish is a singer, actor, director, writer and multiple Tony Award-winning producer who is based in Portland, Oregon and New York City.

Background
Brunish was born in Los Angeles, California. After spending his early years in Belgium and Copenhagen, he attended Beverly Hills High School, where he first discovered his love of music while listening to the cast recordings of Broadway shows. He received a BA in Theatre Arts from Occidental College cum laude. It was there he began his acting career doing up to six shows in repertory at the Remsen Bird Theatre.

He moved to Oregon shortly thereafter and worked as a property developer while appearing in numerous theatre productions, indie movies, TV shows and feature films. He also recorded over 500 songs. He has released more than a dozen CDs featuring mostly covers of standards and show tunes.  CDs featuring his voice include Broadway Records' recording of "Jekyll and Hyde," which was released in September 2012. His first foray into producing a cast recording was the musical Bonnie & Clyde. The show was nominated for two Tony Awards including Best Score (Frank Wildhorn and Don Black) and Best Actress (Laura Osnes) 

In February 2015, he appeared on the NBC series Grimm as Laszlo Kurlon, the fortune telling Fuchsbau (episode 4-12).

In February 2017, Brunish released his debut, solo album on Broadway Records: #ThrowbackThursday. His follow-up CD Just The Three Of Us dedicated to his wife Jessica and daughter was released in December 2020.

Directorial debut
Brunish made his debut as director with "One Flew Over the Cuckoo's Nest." He directed Stephen Sondheim's "Company" in 2009.

Mentored by Jeff Calhoun, Brunish started producing in 2011. He came to New York as assistant director and producer of the Broadway musical "Bonnie and Clyde". After the show closed, he largely funded the recording the show's cast album.

Amid his other projects, Brunish directed Sherlock Holmes & the Case of The Jersey Lily and "Dracula" at t

he Temple Theatre in Sanford, NC. More recently, Brunish directed It's A Wonderful Life, Shrek and Hedwig and the Angry Inch in Portland, Oregon.

Tony Awards
Of the productions Brunish has been involved with as an investor, the shows have garnered 110 Tony Nominations and 45 Tony Awards. As a producer, that number is 132 nominations and 34 wins, while personally Brunish has received 12 consecutive nominations in 10 seasons and four Tony Awards. He received a Tony as producer when Porgy and Bess won for Best Musical Revival in 2012.

In 2013 Brunish received a second Tony Award as a producer of the revival of Pippin. He also was the recipient of the 2013 Drama Desk Award, Drama League Award and the Outer Critic's Circle Award for the same show and those same awards for Come From Away in 2017.

In 2018 Brunish received his third Tony for Once on This Island.

In 2022 Brunish scored his fourth Tony for Company by Stephen Sondheim. Sondheim passed before the show opened. Brunish appeared on stage at the Tonys to accept the award with his co-producers, holding a portrait of Sondheim for the duration.

Brunish helped to produce the soundtrack for Nice Work If you Can Get It. The CD was nominated for a Grammy Award."

His most notable producing credit is Beautiful: The Carole King Musical, one of the longest running shows on Broadway and for which the Cast CD won the Grammy Award. The show ranks in the top 3% longest running musicals in Broadway history.

Later, he helped produce the cast recording of The Color Purple, which won the Grammy Award.

Brunish garnered his eighth consecutive Tony nomination for Come From Away in 2017, his ninth in 2018 for Once on this Island and his tenth for Tootsie.

In 2020, Brunish garnered his 11th consecutive Tony Nomination for Slave Play.

He is also the recipient of 2 Audience Choice Awards, 3 Broadway.com Awards and an Olivier Award, England's equivalent of the Tony Award.

As of February 2020, Brunish has 2 shows as producer among the top 25 most popular musicals of all time and 2 additional shows as investor, also among the top 25 most popular in Broadway history. (Those shows include Beautiful The Carole King Musical and Come From Away as producer and Matilda and Dear Evan Hansen as investor)
Also, as an investor in It's Only A Play and Angels in America, and a producer of The Play That Goes Wrong, he is associated with three of the top 12 straight plays of all time.
Slave Play, another producing credit, holds the record for most Tony Award nominations in history for a play with 12.

Personal life
Brunish is married to Jessica Rose Brunish. They have a daughter.

Philanthropy
Brunish is a donor to Broadway Cares/Equity Fights AIDS.  He named the Brunish Theatre in Portland, Oregon (part of Antoinette Hatfield Hall) as a surprise for his mother's 75th birthday.
He produced a CD called Portland Sings for Haiti, the proceeds from which went to aid the citizens of Haiti recovering from the earthquake of 2010.

Film and TV producing
He serves as producer on Broadway: Beyond The Golden Age, and on the filming of the West End production of Gypsy with Imelda Staunton.
He has two Emmy nominations (New York Region) as a producer on Due Process.
Brunish also funded the taping of the TV special Women of Soul filmed at the Obama White House and aired on Public TV, starring Aretha Franklin, Melissa Etheridge, Patti LaBelle, Janelle Monáe and Ariana Grande.
In 2017, Brunish acted in Woodstock or Bust, starring Willow Shields (Hunger Games) and Meg Delacy (The Fosters).
Brunish is a producer on a documentary film about the original creators of West Side Story. The film includes interviews with all 20 surviving members (at the time of filming) of the Broadway company including Chita Rivera, Hal Prince, Stephen Sondheim and Carol Lawrence.

In partnership with Spencer Proffer and Russell Miller, Brunish produces documentary films, streaming content and new works for Broadway. 
Their latest release is American Pie about the beloved song by Don McLean of the same name.
In 2022, Brunish appears in the new documentary about the invention of Claymation by Will Vinton, titled Clay Dream.

Off-Broadway
Brunish has served as a producer or investor on the plays 39 Steps, I and You, City Stories (musical) All Is Calm (Drama Desk Award) and Standard Time (dance musical). He is an investor in Georgie, starring Ed Dixon for which Dixon won the Drama Desk award for best solo show. The show will tour the US. He also helped to launch the cabaret titled "Finding My Voice" a one-woman show starring Kathleen Turner.

Shows for the 2016-2017 Broadway season
Brunish was a producer on Come From Away and The Play That Goes Wrong and is an investor in Dear Evan Hansen, Hello Dolly.
On the West End he is an investor in Dreamgirls. Beautiful The Carole King Musical ran for 6 years Broadway, placing it in the top 3% of all Broadway musicals.

Shows for the 2017–2018 season
Brunish was a producer on the revival of Once On This Island and an investor in the revival of Angels in America, and the new shows 1984 and The Band's Visit. Brunish and wife Jessica presented a revival of The Rink in London in 2018.

Shows for the 2018–2019 season
Brunish and his wife served as producers on the new musical Tootsie, adapted from the film of the same name. The score is by Tony winner David Yazbek. They are also investors in Network starring Bryan Cranston and adapted from the notable film by Paddy Chayefsky.
Under a newly formed partnership with Russell Miller and Spencer Proffer, Brunish is developing new works.  
Currently, with Proffer and Miller, Brunish is producing two documentary films. Defying Gravity, the story of Stephen Schwartz and his huge impact on Broadway and Hollywood, and American Pie, the story of Don McLean's classic song of the same name.

New musical book writer
Brunish has collaborated with Dina and Rosabella Gregory to create a new musical called My Marcello, which was chosen out of 300 musicals to have a reading in London in 2018. A concept album was released on Broadway Records on August 20 of 2021. The album stars Laura Osnes, Santino Fontana, Terrence Mann, Derek Klena, Elizabeth Stanley, Robert Cuccioli and Raymond Jaramillo McLeod.

Broadway productions 2019–2020 and 2022-2023 seasons
Was a producer on Slave Play and Company, the former which was nominated for 12 Tonys and the latter which won five Tony Awards.
For the current season Brunish is a producer on Parade, an investor in New York, New York and in Peter Pan Goes Wrong.

The Pandemic and Broadway
Along with many other Broadway industry regulars, Brunish contributed an essay about the challenges the pandemic has presented, in a book called "When The Lights Are Bright Again."
In 2022, Brunish served as Assistant Director on the UK premiere of Bonnie & Clyde. The show received unanimously positive reviews as well as the What's On Stage Award for Best New Muscial.
With the release of the CD of the Cast Recording of Music Man with Sutton Foster and Hugh Jackman in 2022, Brunish will have written his second set of liner notes for a Broadway Cast Recording, the first being for Bonnie & Clyde in 2012.

In 2021, Brunish garnered a Grammy Nomination as a producer on the theatre album Snapshots by Stephen Schwartz released on Broadway Records.

References

Living people
Year of birth missing (living people)
Male actors from Los Angeles
American theatre directors
American theatre managers and producers
Musicians from Los Angeles
Musicians from Portland, Oregon
Male actors from Portland, Oregon